Andrei Rybakou (born March 4, 1982) is a former Belarusian weightlifter, Olympian and two-time World Champion who competed in the 85 kg category. In 2016, after a retest of his 2008 samples tested positive for Dehydrochloromethyl-testosterone and Stanozolol his performance at the 2008 Olympic Games was disqualified, as well as his Olympic record and World record set during the competition. He was also ordered to return his silver medal.

Career

Olympics
In 2004 Rybakou made his Olympic debut at the 2004 Summer Olympics, where he competed in the 85 kg category. During the snatch portion, after making a 180.0 kg lift, he attempted a new world record lift of 183.0 kg, he did not make the lift as the clock ran out on him, but as he was competing in the B category he had a 12.5 kg lead over the net closest competitor. During the clean & jerk portion of the competition his last successful lift of 200.0 kg gave him a total of 380.0 kg which led the second place competitor in the B group by 25.0 kg. It was not until Giorgi Asanidze's first clean & jerk of 202.5 kg in the A session that Rybakou was bumped from the gold medal position. Giorgi Asanidze ended up becoming Olympic Champion and Rybakou was awarded the silver medal.

Following his silver medal finish in 2004, two World Weightlifting Championships wins in 2006 and 2007, and after setting 4 world records, he was a favorite to win gold at the 2008 Summer Olympics. In the snatch portion he set a new Olympic Record lift of 185 kg, giving him a 5 kg lead over Lu Yong. In the clean and jerk aspect, he made all three lifts finishing with a 209 kg clean & jerk, setting a new world record total of 394 kg. Lu Yong attempted, and initially made a 214 kg clean & jerk on his second attempt before the jury overruled the results and that lift was declared a no lift, in his third attempt Lu made the 214 kg lift. As Lu weighed 0.28 kg less, he was awarded the gold medal, and Rybakou was again the silver medalist. In 2016, after a retest of his 2008 samples tested positive for Dehydrochloromethyl-testosterone and Stanozolol his performance at the 2008 Olympic Games was disqualified, as well as his Olympic record and World record set during the competition. He was also ordered to return his silver medal.

In 2012 he competed at the 2012 Summer Olympics in the 85 kg category, but was unable to complete a snatch, because of this he could not compete in the clean & jerk portion of the competition which resulted in a DNF.

Other Championships
In April 2006, he won the European Championship. Later that year, during the 2006 World Weightlifting Championships he was crowned as the World Champion in the 85 kg category.

He won the gold medal in the 85 kg category again at the 2007 World Weightlifting Championships, setting a world record with a 187 kg snatch.

Major results

Notes
  Not a world record at the time of the competition, became a world record when IWF decided to eliminate the world standards from the list of World Records on 24 June 2008.

References

1982 births
Living people
People from Mogilev
Belarusian male weightlifters
Medalists at the 2004 Summer Olympics
Weightlifters at the 2004 Summer Olympics
Weightlifters at the 2008 Summer Olympics
Weightlifters at the 2012 Summer Olympics
Olympic weightlifters of Belarus
Olympic silver medalists for Belarus
Olympic medalists in weightlifting
World record holders in Olympic weightlifting
Belarusian sportspeople in doping cases
Doping cases in weightlifting
Competitors stripped of Summer Olympics medals
European Weightlifting Championships medalists
World Weightlifting Championships medalists
Sportspeople from Mogilev Region